Deutsche Post is a brand of Deutsche Post AG used for its domestic mail services in Germany. The services offered under the brand are those of a traditional mail service, making the brand the successor of the former state-owned mail monopoly, Deutsche Bundespost. As of 2008, the monopoly for Deutsche Post on these services has expired.

Most businesses unrelated to traditional mail services have been switched over to the DHL brand acquired with the original DHL company. The group uses the name Deutsche Post DHL.

Products 
The group currently offers the following services under the brand, all within its Mail division:

 Mail Communication handles the domestic mail service (except parcels).
 Press Services handles domestic distribution of print products (newspapers and magazines).
 Retail Outlets operates domestic retail outlets (post offices), which offer a complete array of letter mail, parcel and Postbank services. 
 Dialogue Marketing provides services for direct marketing such as market research and address verification.

Other services within the Mail division, such as Parcel Germany and Global Mail, use the DHL brand.

See also 
Postal codes in Germany

References

Postal organizations